Statistics of Nemzeti Bajnokság I for the 1918–19 season.

Overview
It was contested by 12 teams, and MTK Hungária FC won the championship.

League standings

Results

References
Hungary - List of final tables (RSSSF)

1918-19
Hun
1918–19 in Hungarian football